The Molten Man (Mark Raxton) is a fictional character appearing in American comic books published by Marvel Comics. Once a chemical engineer who longed to get rich, Mark Raxton was caught in an accident that saw his body get covered by an experimental organic-liquid metal alloy, which granted him superpowers, including the ability to generate extreme heat and radiation. Turning to a life of crime, he started off as an enemy of the superhero Spider-Man, but eventually was redeemed. He is also the stepbrother of Liz Allan.

The character has made appearances in several forms of media, including animated series and video games. A creature based on the "Molten Man" appeared in the Marvel Cinematic Universe film Spider-Man: Far From Home (2019), which was actually an illusion created by a series of drones operated by Mysterio.

Publication history
The character was created by Stan Lee and Steve Ditko and first appeared in The Amazing Spider-Man #28 (September 1965).

Fictional character biography
Mark Raxton was born in New York City. He was a scientist who could not wait to use his skills to become rich and once worked at Oscorp Industries as the laboratory assistant to Dr. Spencer Smythe, creator of the Spider-Slayers. Raxton and Smythe developed an experimental new liquid metallic alloy for the Spider-Slayers from a radioactive meteor, but Raxton in his greed and impatience, attempted to steal it and sell it, ignoring Smythe's protests that it needed further testing. In the ensuing fight with Smythe in the laboratory, Raxton spilled the liquid alloy all over himself, his skin absorbing it and turning golden. Fearing for his life, Raxton ran for the nearest hospital, only to discover that the alloy had changed him for the better when he angrily punched an irate motorist's hood, buckling it. Realizing the great potential his new abilities afforded him, Raxton, calling himself the Molten Man, turned to crime to further his monetary gains. Peter Parker, as Spider-Man, nearly missed his high school graduation to stop the Molten Man's first crime spree. Raxton was later released from jail, only to continue his criminal activities. However, he was once again defeated by Spider-Man.

In his third encounter with Spider-Man, it was revealed that Peter's friend Liz Allan was Raxton's stepsister, and the Molten Man's metallic skin had begun to give off intense heat and to consume itself. His metallic skin became molten and he steals meteor fragments from a museum to attempt a cure. An encounter with Spider-Man resulted in his submergence in the polluted East River, which temporarily reversed the deterioration.

In another encounter, Raxton broke into a pharmaceutical company to steal chemicals which would reverse his condition permanently. When the procedure failed, he went berserk and demanded to speak to Liz, who agreed to talk to him and also tried to convince him to surrender. Liz was saved by Spider-Man and the Molten Man became buried beneath the laboratory. He later resurfaced at the same site and once again sought his stepsister. Spider-Man prevented the Molten Man from hurting her, knocking him into a swimming pool which extinguished the Molten Man's flames and cooled his metallic skin. He was then taken to the Vault, a prison for superhuman criminals.

Raxton realized that his stepsister was the only member of his family who had not abandoned him. He was eventually released from the Vault and approached Liz to apologize. Spider-Man misunderstood his intentions and battled him once more. Reconciled with Raxton, Liz and her husband Harry Osborn gave Raxton a job as head of security at Osborn Industries. The Molten Man later teamed up with Spider-Man and the second Green Goblin against Tombstone and Hammerhead. The Molten Man was then kidnapped along with Liz, Normie Osborn and Spider-Man by Harry Osborn, who had suffered a mental relapse, making him the Green Goblin once again. The Molten Man was saved by Spider-Man. The Molten Man and Spider-Man have since become friends, and the Molten Man has occasionally used his powers to aid Spider-Man against other supervillains. A few times he has been a bodyguard for Peter Parker's friends and family when disasters overwhelm the city.

In the months following the Clone Saga, Raxton was abducted by Norman Osborn, the Green Goblin, and brainwashed. Under mind control, the Molten Man attacked and killed Osborn's henchman Alison Mongraine, the only person who knew of the location of Peter and Mary Jane's baby. Although the Molten Man has since recovered from the mind control, he still bears a heavy burden of guilt over the incident.

Sometime after Harry Osborn's death, Raxton is summoned when mysterious forces kidnap Liz Allan's son, Normie Osborn. The Molten Man uses his brawn and brains to help Spider-Man and the Daily Bugle reporter Ben Urich uncover what happened. Raxton is later pressed into a supervillain group again when the Chameleon approaches him and threatens to kill Normie if Raxton does not join his 'Exterminators'. Raxton is consequently forced to attack Liz Allan.

During the Civil War storyline, the Molten Man and the Scarecrow were used as bait for Captain America's Secret Avengers, only for the Punisher to arrive. Raxton is left in critical condition after being attacked by the Punisher.

Raxton next appears, still in poor condition, under the care of Liz Allan. When Harry Osborn comes to visit Liz and Normie, he and Liz argue. Hearing Liz speak Harry's name, Raxton awakens and attacks him, screaming that Harry has hurt his family for the last time and will "die for real". Spider-Man intervenes, but he has trouble fighting Raxton, whose powers have grown out of control. Spider-Man manages to trap Raxton in asphalt, and Harry provides him with a cure that Oscorp had been working on upon using volunteer Charlie Weiderman, the other "Molten Man". The cure is successful, returning Raxton to his original human state. Although he finally was rid of the alloy, he still retained his powers, such as super strength, energy manipulation and a new power to incinerate anything by producing fire from his palms. Harry built him a special suit, using a part of the alloy and his DNA, to help him control his powers.

When Liz Allan became the head of Alchemax, she used the company's cutting-edge technology to cure Raxton of his condition. Even though he was constantly monitored, he was no longer a threat to society and started working as a member of Alchemax's security force. As Alchemax and Parker Industries competed for a contract to build a new prison, Raxton and Tiberius Stone used Raxton's connections to hire the Ghost to sabotage Parker Industries.

Powers and abilities
Originally, Mark Raxton was given unnatural powers after the exposure to an experimental liquid metal alloy obtained from a meteor discovered by Spencer Smythe. His body completely absorbed its organic properties, turning all of these external tissues into a solid metallic substance, as well as trunks, belt, and boots he wore right before the accident. As a result, the Molten Man possesses superior strength and high resistance to physical injury. His skin is composed of a frictionless metal that causes things to slip off, including Spider-Man's webbing. Raxton's metallic fingers are sensitive enough to pick locks (making him an expert safe cracker). He can generate fierce flames, incinerating anybody who tries to touch him or shooting fire-like blasts at his foes. In this form, the Molten Man's metallic skin would reach a critical stage at which point it could actually dissolve, slowly at first, then faster, and eventually be burned away by its own temperature.

Additionally, unlike most of Spider-Man's more thuggish villains, the Molten Man had brains to complement his raw physical strength. An intelligent, but very sane scientist, Raxton was smart enough to learn from his own mistakes and not fall for the same trick twice. He is a college graduate with a Bachelor of Science degree in chemical engineering.

Other versions

Ultimate Marvel
In the Ultimate Marvel universe, Mark Raxton is a guitarist in a local punk rock band, the name of which is later revealed to be "Molten Man". One of their songs includes the lyrics "I am your molten man and I'm melting on you".

He first appears in the story "Dumped", in Ultimate Spider-Man #78. He asks Mary Jane Watson on a date. She reluctantly accepts, but spends most of the evening talking about Peter Parker, who has just broken up with her. Raxton remains a gentleman the entire time. Later, he encounters Mary Jane at the mall, and upon learning that the boy she was with was Peter, tells her "Good for you", and leaves without further incident.

He later appears in Ultimate Spider-Man #88, the third part of the "Silver Sable" storyline. In the story, a student from Parker's high school dresses up as Spider-Man and runs out in front of the press. He is revealed to be Mark Raxton, who tries to promote his band Molten Man before being dragged away by police.

In other media

Television

 A variation of the Molten Man named Mark Allan appears in the second season of The Spectacular Spider-Man, voiced by Eric Lopez. This version is Liz Allan's biological brother. Prior to his appearance in the series, Mark spent six months in juvenile detention for stealing a car to pay off gambling debts. In the episode "First Steps", he returns to Midtown High and quickly becomes smitten with Mary Jane Watson, whom he ends up dating. However, he eventually backslides into gambling and becomes indebted to Blackie Gaxton, his former bookie. In "Subtext", seeing no other way to pay off his debts, Mark becomes a test subject for the Green Goblin's experiments and is injected with a special solution by Miles Warren that turns Mark's skin metallic and later grants him pyrokinetic abilities. Secretly controlling Mark's abilities, the Goblin manipulates Mark into fighting Spider-Man as the Molten Man, though Mark is ultimately defeated and taken into police custody. In the episode "Opening Night", Mark is remanded to the Vault until he is released by the Goblin to hunt down Spider-Man, who was there to test the prison's security. Mark and the inmates nearly succeed until they are eventually knocked out by gas released by Walter Hardy and subsequently re-incarcerated. 
 The Molten Man makes minor appearances in Ultimate Spider-Man, voiced by James Arnold Taylor. This version first encounters Spider-Man when he teams up with Triton, and is defeated by them. In the “Contest of Champions” special episode, he appears as one of Grandmaster’s choices for the contest, and is eventually defeated after he is tricked into landing in water.
 The Molten Man appears in the Spider-Man episode "Brand New Day", voiced by Imari Williams. This version is a mutant volcano creature who constantly participates in gang wars with Mr. Negative.

Film
A member of the Elementals inspired by the Molten Man appeared in the live-action Marvel Cinematic Universe film Spider-Man: Far From Home. Director Jon Watts described his take for the creation: "There’s so many Spider-Man villains from the rogues gallery that I wanted to dig a little bit deeper than what anyone might be expecting...villains like Hydro-Man and Molten Man, who may not be on the highest list. But that opened up such amazing visual possibilities and poses really dangerous challenges for Spider-Man". Identified as the Fire Elemental, Mysterio claimed it used its abilities to feed off of metal and energy from Earth's core to destroy his Earth. The Fire Elemental attacks Prague during the Signal Festival, though Spider-Man and Mysterio defeat it. Not long after however, the web-slinger discovers all of the Elementals were illusions created by Mysterio and his fellow ex-Stark Industries employees to obtain Tony Stark's technology and make Mysterio look like a hero.

Video games
 The Molten Man appears as a non-player character and boss in the PS3, Xbox 360, PS4, Xbox One, and PC versions of Marvel: Ultimate Alliance 2. He is among the supervillains placed under S.H.I.E.L.D.'s control via nanites. In the Pro-Registration campaign, the Molten Man is used to assist the heroes in fighting Goliath. In the Anti-Registration campaign, he serves as a boss and attacks Cloak and Dagger alongside the She-Hulk until the heroes intervene and defeat them. Later, when the nanites attain sentience, the Molten Man is among the supervillains placed under their control and fights the heroes on both sides.

References

External links
 Molten Man at Marvel.com
 Mark Raxton at Marvel Database
 Molten Man at Writeups.org
 Molten Man at Comic Vine
 Molten Man at the Appendix to the Handbook of the Marvel Universe

Characters created by Stan Lee
Characters created by Steve Ditko
Comics characters introduced in 1965
Fictional American scientists and engineers
Fictional characters from New York City
Fictional characters with fire or heat abilities
Fictional characters with superhuman durability or invulnerability
Fictional chemical engineers
Fictional chemists
Marvel Comics characters with superhuman strength
Marvel Comics mutates
Marvel Comics male superheroes
Marvel Comics male supervillains
Marvel Comics scientists
Marvel Comics superheroes
Marvel Comics supervillains
Spider-Man characters